"My Generation/Understand" is the ninth single by the Japanese artist Yui. Even though this is a double-A single, "Understand" is not included on the album I Loved Yesterday, but the song is included in the B-side compilation album, My Short Stories. "My Generation" was used as the theme song for the drama Seito Shokun!.

Track listing

Charts

Oricon sales chart (Japan)

External links
Official Yui website

2007 singles
Yui (singer) songs
Oricon Weekly number-one singles
Songs written by Yui (singer)
Japanese television drama theme songs